The 1930 Boston Red Sox season was the 30th season in the franchise's Major League Baseball history. The team's home field was Fenway Park. The Red Sox finished last in the eight-team American League (AL) with a record of 52 wins and 102 losses, 50 games behind the Philadelphia Athletics, who went on to win the 1930 World Series.

The Red Sox played their Sunday home games at Braves Field this season, as had been the case since the team's 1929 season, due to Fenway being close to a house of worship. The team played a total of 20 home games at Braves Field during the 1930 season; 16 games on Sundays, plus two non-Sunday doubleheaders.

Regular season

Season standings

Record vs. opponents

Opening Day lineup

Roster 

During the season, the Red Sox and the Boston Braves wore a patch commemorating Boston's tricentennial.

Player stats

Batting

Starters by position 
Note: Pos = Position; G = Games played; AB = At bats; H = Hits; Avg. = Batting average; HR = Home runs; RBI = Runs batted in

Other batters 
Note: G = Games played; AB = At bats; H = Hits; Avg. = Batting average; HR = Home runs; RBI = Runs batted in

Pitching

Starting pitchers 
Note: G = Games pitched; IP = Innings pitched; W = Wins; L = Losses; ERA = Earned run average; SO = Strikeouts

Other pitchers 
Note: G = Games pitched; IP = Innings pitched; W = Wins; L = Losses; ERA = Earned run average; SO = Strikeouts

Relief pitchers 
Note: G = Games pitched; W = Wins; L = Losses; SV = Saves; ERA = Earned run average; SO = Strikeouts

References

External links
1930 Boston Red Sox team page at Baseball Reference
1930 Boston Red Sox season at baseball-almanac.com

Boston Red Sox seasons
Boston Red Sox
Boston Red Sox
1930s in Boston